The F55 (or N55 as it is known in the U.S.) is a 35mm film SLR autofocus camera introduced by Nikon in 2002.

History and Description
It was targeted at a new and lower price-point than the F65 (previously Nikon's cheapest autofocus SLR). The F65 continued to be sold alongside the F55. The camera is made in Thailand.

It is unique among recent Nikon autofocus SLRs in that it does not support autofocus on Nikon lenses with "AF-S" silent wave motor focussing, or the "VR" optical stabilisation features found on some lenses.

It features several different operating modes, including seven program modes that are subject specific, Aperture Priority, Shutter Priority, and Manual.

Included with the F55D variant is a date/time-imprinting facility, ("Data imprinting,") but at the cost of a slightly larger camera body.

References

External links 

 Nikon.com – Information on the F55 - includes specifications

F055
F055